WSTW (93.7 FM, "93.7 WSTW") is a commercial FM radio station licensed to serve Wilmington, Delaware. The station is owned by (Forever Media) and broadcasts a contemporary hit radio (CHR) format.

WSTW's studios and offices are on Shipley Road in Wilmington. In addition to Wilmington and Northern Delaware, the station's 47,100 watt signal covers Philadelphia and other parts of Pennsylvania as well as sections of New Jersey and Maryland.

History

In 1950, the station signed on as WDEL-FM. At first it simulcast the programming of sister station AM 1150 WDEL, airing middle of the road music, talk, news and sports. But by the late 1960s, it was separately programmed, switching the call sign to WSTW. The call sign stood for "We're Stereo to Wilmington", as the first stereo FM in Wilmington, Delaware - its city of license. Steinman Enterprises is a family-owned broadcasting, newspaper and mining company based in Lancaster, Pennsylvania. For more than a decade, WSTW carried an easy listening and middle of the road music format that was largely automated.

In 1980, WSTW switched to an automated Top 40 format, using the TM "Stereo Rock" service. By the mid-1980s, station management added disc jockeys and ended the automation. Over the years, the station has made slight changes in programming, switching from Top 40 to Hot AC and back again. In the mid-1990s, the station made the move to Hot AC. Around 2000, it moved back to Top 40.

In May 2005, WSTW created the "Rewards" program for winning and obtaining prizes. The "Choice Rewards" system allows listeners of the station to bid on auctions for WSTW concerts, merchandise, etc., based on how many points the user has. Users obtain these points by typing in "Choice Words", which they hear on WSTW itself, on the "Rewards" website. The "Rewards" program was changed later, with "Choice Words" being solely found on the WSTW webpage, at station appearances, and via online surveys.

In 2006, WSTW was chosen as CHR Station of the Year of the Marconi Award by the National Association of Broadcasters.

On April 5, 2018, programming on WSTW-HD2 changed from a simulcast of WDEL/1150 to Spanish AC branded as Amor 95 which is simulcast on translator W237EH on 95.3 in Pennsauken, New Jersey. The translator serves the downtown Philadelphia area and the adjacent suburbs in New Jersey.

As of mid-August 2018, the HD2 format, Amor 95, is no longer broadcasting on WSTW-HD2 or on W237EH on 95.3 in the Philadelphia suburbs and downtown Philadelphia and Camden, New Jersey.

As of late-September 2018, the HD2 format is back to a simulcast of sister News/Talk WDEL-AM-FM.

On February 5, 2019, Forever Media, LLC bought out Delmarva Broadcasting Company for $18.5 million which adds 10 more stations to Forever Media, LLC's book of stations that are spread throughout Pennsylvania and Maryland.

Translators

Former air staff
Some notable former air staff members include Alan Price (former morning show personality); Ellis B. "Bruce Ellis" Feaster, now at WPOZ in Orlando, Florida; Dave Fleetwood, recently at WGBG-FM in Seaford, Delaware; and Dave Walls, now an anchor/reporter for WSET-TV in Lynchburg, Virginia.

References

External links

Contemporary hit radio stations in the United States
STW